Trás-os-Montes is a Portuguese independent docufictional and ethnofictional feature film, written, directed and edited by António Reis and Margarida Cordeiro and released in 1976. It takes its name from the Portuguese region of Trás-os-Montes from which the film emanated.

Release and reception 
Uppon watching Trás-os-Montes the French filmmaker and anthropologist Jean Rouch wrote about the film: 
For me, this film reveals a new cinematographic language.
Since its release, the film has been part of the official selection of numerous film festivals and events, from 1976 to nowadays, where it has been awarded several prizes. Among them are:
 1976 - Toulon Film Festival – Special Prize of the Jury, Critics Award
 1976 - Pesaro Film Festival – Critics Award
 1976 - Bedford Film Festival
 1976 - XI Challenge de Cartago
 1977 - Mannheim Film Festival – Main Award of Mannheim 
 1977 - Rotterdam Film Festival
 1977 - Anvers Film Festival
 1977 - Bedalmena Film Festival
 1977 - London Film Festival
 1978 - Viermole Film Festival – Award for Best Film, Award for Best Directing
 1978 - Belgrado Film Festival
 1978 - Venice Film Festival
 1978 - São Paulo's Mostra Internacional de Cinema
 1979 - Lecce Film Festival - Honorable Mention to the Cinematography

In 2011, Trás-os-Montes was screened at the Jeonju International Film Festival, marking the beginning of the international rediscover of the work of António Reis and Margarida Cordeiro.
In 2012, the film was screened in the United States at the Harvard Film Archive, the Anthology Film Archives, at the UCLA Film and Television Archives and at the Pacific Film Archive as part of The School of Reis program.

See also 
 Docufiction
 List of docufiction films

References

External Connections 
 
 Jean Rouch's letter about Trás-os-Montes
 Serge Daney interview to António Reis about Trás-os-Montes (fr)
 Trás-os-Montes at The School of Reis page at the Harvard Film Archive website
 Trás-os-Montes at The School of Reis page at the UCLA Film and Television Archive website
 Trás-os-Montes at The School of Reis (Anthology Film Archives website]

1976 drama films
1976 films
Films directed by António Reis
1970s Portuguese-language films
Ethnofiction films
Portuguese drama films